The Beast of Borneo is a 1934 American Pre-Code film directed by Harry Garson. The film is made up mostly of leftover footage from Universal Studios's East of Borneo, made in 1931. A couple of added dialogue scenes were spliced into what was essentially a travelogue and a series of close-ups of an enraged orangutan.

Plot
A noted big game hunter, Bob Ward (John Preston), is visited in the jungles of Borneo by Russian scientist Boris Borodoff (Eugene Sigaloff) and his lovely assistant Alma Thorne (Mae Stuart), who want to prove the evolutionary link between man and beast. Ward at first declines to lead the scientists to a tribe of orangutans, but Alma's charms finally convince him. Along with Ward's pet orangutan, Borneo Joe, they track the apes and actually manage to capture a male orangutan, whom Dr. Borodoff anaesthetizes with a shot of whiskey. Borodoff, it soon appears, is quite insane—and Bob, in an effort to calm him down, is knocked unconscious and dragged into the jungle by the tormented orangutan. He is rescued by Alma and Borneo Joe, but the trio can only watch as the enraged simian kills the evil Dr. Borodoff.

Cast
John Preston as Bob Ward
Mae Stuart as Alma Thorne
Eugene Sigaloff as Dr. Boris Borodoff
Val Duran as Darmo
Doris Brook as Nahnda
Alexander Schoenberg as Controller Derrick van de Mark
John Peters as Mr. Kruger

External links

1934 films
1934 horror films
1934 adventure films
American adventure films
American black-and-white films
Films set in Borneo
Films directed by Harry Garson
Films about apes
1930s English-language films
1930s American films